Eric Orlando Young Jr. (born May 25, 1985) is an American professional baseball coach and former outfielder who is the first base coach for the for the Washington Nationals of Major League Baseball (MLB). He played in MLB for the Colorado Rockies, New York Mets, Atlanta Braves, New York Yankees, and Los Angeles Angels. He was the National League stolen base leader in 2013.

Baseball career
Young was born in New Brunswick, New Jersey and graduated from Piscataway Township High School in Piscataway, New Jersey. He had a football scholarship to attend Villanova University. The Colorado Rockies selected Young in the 30th round of the 2003 Major League Baseball draft, and he signed rather than attend college.

Young began his career playing in 2004 for the Casper Rockies (now the Grand Junction Rockies), that was an advanced rookie team located in Casper, Wyoming and was part of the Pioneer League. In 2006, Young led all minor leaguers in stolen bases with 87. He then won the Arizona Fall League batting title, finishing with a .430 average. Young appeared in the 2009 Futures Game, hitting a three-run home run. The world team won 7 to 5.

Colorado Rockies
Young made his major league debut on August 25, 2009, for the Colorado Rockies playing center field. He had his first career hit in this game during the 5th inning and ended the game 1–4. Eric Young Sr. was in attendance for his son's debut. On September 8, 2009, Young Jr. hit his first career home run in the bottom of the 6th inning against the Cincinnati Reds.

During spring training for the 2010 season, Young was optioned to the team's Triple-A affiliate, the Colorado Springs Sky Sox. On April 25, 2010, Young was recalled to the Rockies from Colorado Springs. On May 15, 2010, he suffered a stress fracture and was placed on the DL. He would return from the DL to Coors Field on August 14, 2010. On May 27, 2011, he was called back up to the Rockies with an above .300 batting average with the Sky Sox.

New York Mets
Young was designated for assignment on June 12, 2013, and traded to the New York Mets on June 18, 2013, in exchange for Collin McHugh. On July 24, 2013, Young was involved in a season-ending accident with Tim Hudson. Hudson was covering the first base bag, and Young attempted to beat the groundout. When Young stepped late on the bag, his cleat dug hard into Hudson's ankle full stride, unnaturally rolling it. This incident broke Hudson's ankle and ultimately ended Hudson's last season with the Braves. Young expressed extreme concern for Hudson after the play ended.

On August 2, 2013, Young hit the first walk-off hit of his career, a two-run home run, in the 11th inning against the Kansas City Royals. On September 29, 2013, in the final game of the season, Young stole his 45th and 46th bases against the Milwaukee Brewers, becoming the National League stolen base leader. He is the Mets' first stolen bases champion since José Reyes in 2007. On December 2, 2014, Young was non-tendered by the Mets.

Atlanta Braves
Young signed a minor league contract with the Atlanta Braves on February 13, 2015. The deal included an invitation to spring training. On June 5, 2015, the Braves designated Young for assignment. With Atlanta, he batted .169/.229/.273.

Second stint with the Mets
On August 22, 2015, Young was traded back to the Mets in exchange for cash considerations. He was removed from the 40-man roster on November 5, 2015, making him a free agent. Young had a batting average of .153 with no home runs, five RBIs and .217 on-base percentage with both the Braves and the Mets in 2015.

Milwaukee Brewers
On January 5, 2016, Young signed a minor league contract with the Brewers, with an invitation to spring training. He was one of nine players competing to be the Brewers center fielder for the 2016 season. Center field was one of the last positions the Brewers decided, but Young did not make the Opening Day roster.

New York Yankees
On August 31, 2016, the Brewers traded Young to the New York Yankees for cash considerations. The Yankees assigned him to the Scranton/Wilkes-Barre RailRiders.

Los Angeles Angels
On January 24, 2017, the Angels signed Young Jr. to a minor league deal, later calling him up to replace the injured Mike Trout. On May 31, Young hit a game-winning solo home run in the eighth inning to give the Angels a 2–1 lead against the Atlanta Braves. This was his first home run since 2014. The Angels went on to win by that score. He was outrighted on July 13. He was called back up during the end of the season. In 110 at bats, Young tied a career high by hitting 4 home runs; he was outrighted and elected free agency after the season.

On January 4, 2018, the Angels re-signed Young to a minor league deal. He was assigned to AAA Salt Lake Bees for the 2018 season. He was recalled on July 27. In 109 at bats, he batted .202/.248/.303.

Baltimore Orioles
On February 9, 2019, the Orioles signed Young Jr. to a minor league contract that included an invitation to spring training. He was released on March 22, 2019.

Seattle Mariners
On March 26, 2019, Young Jr. signed a minor league deal with the Seattle Mariners. He was released on July 23, 2019.

Acereros de Monclova
On July 28, 2019, Young Jr. signed with the Acereros de Monclova of the Mexican League. He was released on January 24, 2020.

Guerreros de Oaxaca
On February 12, 2020, Young Jr. signed with the Guerreros de Oaxaca of the Mexican League. Young Jr. did not play in a game in 2020 due to the cancellation of the Mexican League season because of the COVID-19 pandemic. On November 18, 2020, Young Jr. was released by the Guerreros.

Coaching career
On January 27, 2021, Young Jr. was announced to be part of the coaching staff of the Tacoma Rainiers, Triple-A affiliate of the Seattle Mariners. The Rainiers announced October 28, 2021, that Young would become first base coach for the Washington Nationals of Major League Baseball.

Personal life
Young is the son of former professional baseball player Eric Young Sr. and the paternal half-brother of actor Dallas Dupree Young.

Young and his wife, Victoria, lost their son shortly after birth.

See also

List of second-generation Major League Baseball players
List of Major League Baseball annual stolen base leaders

References

External links

1985 births
Living people
Acereros de Monclova players
African-American baseball players
American expatriate baseball players in Mexico
Arizona League Mariners players
Asheville Tourists players
Atlanta Braves players
Baseball players from New Jersey
Binghamton Mets players
Bravos de Margarita players
American expatriate baseball players in Venezuela
Casper Rockies players
Chandler–Gilbert Coyotes baseball players
Colorado Rockies players
Colorado Springs Sky Sox players
Gwinnett Braves players
Las Vegas 51s players
Leones del Escogido players
American expatriate baseball players in the Dominican Republic
Los Angeles Angels players
Major League Baseball left fielders
Major League Baseball second basemen
Modesto Nuts players
Naranjeros de Hermosillo players
National League stolen base champions
New York Mets players
New York Yankees players
People from Manhattan
Sportspeople from New Brunswick, New Jersey
Baseball players from New York City
People from Piscataway, New Jersey
Phoenix Desert Dogs players
Piscataway High School alumni
Salt Lake Bees players
St. Lucie Mets players
Tulsa Drillers players
Tacoma Rainiers players
Waikiki Beach Boys players
21st-century African-American sportspeople
20th-century African-American people